Ryo Ishii is the name of:

Ryo Ishii (footballer, born 1993), Japanese footballer
Ryo Ishii (footballer, born 2000), Japanese footballer